Events from the year 1522 in Ireland.

Incumbent
Lord: Henry VIII

Events
Hugh Inge, Primate of Ireland appointed Lord Chancellor of Ireland.

Births
Christopher Barnewall, statesman (d. 1575)

Deaths

 Thomas Rochfort (b. ) was a distinguished Irish judge and cleric who held the offices of Solicitor General for Ireland

References

1520s in Ireland
Years of the 16th century in Ireland